Mimi Kalinda, originally from the Democratic Republic of the Congo and Rwanda and raised in South Africa, is the Group CEO and Co-founder of Africa Communications Media Group, (ACG), a pan African public relations and communications agency based in Johannesburg, South Africa. Kalinda also serves as the Director of Global Communications for Innovations for Poverty Action headquartered in Washington, DC. She is the former Brand, Marketing and Communications Director at the Global Development Incubator, headquartered in Washington, DC. Kalinda is also the former director of communications for the African Institute for Mathematical Sciences (AIMS), a pan-African network of centres of excellence in mathematical sciences.

Career 
Previously, as FleishmanHillard (FH)’s Africa Lead, Kalinda was responsible for the global public relations firm’s engagement with its affiliates in Africa as well as identifying and developing partnerships in new markets. Mimi was part of the team that won PRISM Awards for the Barclays Africa "Prosper" campaign as well as the African Union's campaign against Ebola, for which they raised $51 million. Kalinda also worked for Weber Shandwick, where she led pan-African business development efforts and managed social impact accounts, including the Innovation Prize for Africa, the Bill & Melinda Gates Foundation and the Michael & Susan Dell Foundation. She also worked to raise visibility of Samsung’s CSR initiatives during the 2013 African Cup of Nations, and led content creation for the African Union’s CAADP framework and Nigeria’s Ministry of Agriculture. From 2003 to 2006, Kalinda worked in New York City with Director Spike Lee, and she was a production assistant on the film Inside Man. During this time, she also produced and directed her first documentary, Miseducating the World, about the effect of the US news media’s negative portrayal of Africa on Africans living in the diaspora. She was the first African woman to host a show on MTV in 2000, based in London.

Mimi Kalinda was also a host of the Guinness Football Challenge, game show that celebrates soccer with the definitive fan test.

She also hosted a show called "Talking To Africa" on Africa Business radio. The show looked to unpack Africa's reputational challenges and opportunities. Mimi leveraged her experience of over two decades in communications in Africa and abroad to argue and highlight the importance of giving Africans a voice and recreating the African continent's narrative.

Mimi frequently hosts workshops for leaders across Africa on Storytelling and Communications. Through her company Storytelling and Leadership, Kalinda has led workshops on Storytelling and Narrative Leadership for the Obama Foundation Leaders: Africa program, as well as for the University of Cape Town Graduate School of Business: Women in Business Conference, the Africa Trade and Investment Global Summit 2018 in Washington, DC, ABSA in South Africa and Ghana, and WomHub. 

Mimi Kalinda is also an accomplished keynote speaker, narrative shaper and coach. Most recently, she spoke at the continent-wide Vodacom/Vodafone Africa rising Communications Conference as well as the MultiChoice Women in Technology conference. She has also given masterclasses on Storytelling and Narrative Leadership to various local, African, and Global organizations including Old Mutual, Global Health Corps, Dalberg, Project Management Institute, and Momentum Health.

Honours and nominations 
Kalinda's work has been honored through several awards, such as a One World Media Award for Rien Que La Verite, a television program advocating the prevention of HIV/AIDS and an end to violence against women in the DRC. She was also the recipient of the Emerging Producers Bursary from the World Congress of Science and Factual Producers (WCSFP). In 2014, Kalinda presented Music Rekindles History from Japan for the NHK channel, in which she explored how music is providing moral support to people in the Tohoku region now undergoing recovery from the tsunami.

Mimi Kalinda is also a Desmond Tutu Leadership Program Fellow, a programme that welcomes an elite group of Africa's highest potential young leaders, representing a wide range of sectors. Offered on a part-time basis over six months, the programme includes two 9-day Group Learning Modules with an array of distinguished leaders and faculty.

She was nominated for the Women4Africa Awards 2016 as a finalist in the International African Woman of the Year category. Mimi was also a finalist for the Standard Bank Top Women Awards as Entrepreneur of the Year 2019 and 2020. In December 2019, Reset Global People listed her in its annual Top 100 Women CEOs in Africa.

Boards 
Mimi sits on the board of Catalyst for Growth (C4G), a solution launched by JP Morgan and Dalberg to support entrepreneurs across Africa, and she serves on the advisory board of Africa Works Ventures, a Hong Kong based consultancy which facilitates investment from China for promising African companies. Kalinda sits on the Africa Brand Counsel, and is the Rebranding Africa Champion for Africa 2.0.

Book 
Mimi Kalinda is an author of an e-book titled, Talking to Africa: Considering Culture in Communications for a Complex Continent. The book reviews how understanding the cultural dynamics of four major African markets (Nigeria, Kenya, Ethiopia and South Africa) can lead to the development and more successful implementation of communications strategies that are results-driven. The take-home message from this e-book is, when communicating to Africans, do your homework, do not underestimate cultural dynamics, and do not stereotype or make assumptions.

References

External links 
 Blog
 Leading Ladies Africa Interview
 She inspires Her interview

Year of birth missing (living people)
Living people
20th-century South African women
21st-century South African women
Public relations people